Oppomorus noduliferus, common name the nodule castror bean, is a species of sea snail, a marine gastropod mollusk in the family Muricidae, the murex snails or rock snails.

Description
The length of the shell varies between 15 mm and 25 mm.

The ovate, conical shell is of an ash-gray color. The pointed spire is composed of six or seven whorls, the lowest of which composes alone nearly half of the shell. The body whorl is swollen, and slightly compressed above. The other whorls are somewhat convex, except; the last but one. Their surface is ornamented with eleven or twelve distant, prominent, rounded, longitudinal folds, intersected transversely by fine compact striae. The violet gray aperture is ovate and slightly oblique. The outer lip is furnished interiorly with numerous striae which are continued even to the depth of the cavity. The columella is smooth and whitish, with a pretty prominent fold at the base.

Distribution
This marine species occurs off the Philippines, Oceania, Papua New Guinea, New Zealand, New Caledonia and Australia (New South Wales, Queensland and Western Australia)

References

 Menke, K.T. 1829. Verzeichniss der ansehnlischen Conchylien-Sammlung der Freiherrn von der Malsburg. Pyrmonti : Publisher not known pp. i–vi, 1–123. 
 Duclos, M. 1832. Description de quelques espèces de Pourpres, servant de type a six sections establies dans ce Genre. Annales des Sciences Naturelles, Paris 26: 103–113
 Iredale, T. 1937. Mollusca. pp. 232–261, pls 15–17 in Whitley, G.P. The Middleton and Elizabeth Reefs South Pacific Ocean. The Australian Zoologist 8: 232–261
 Maes, V.O. 1967. The littoral marine mollusks of Cocos-Keeling Islands (Indian Ocean). Proceedings of the Academy of Natural Sciences, Philadelphia 119: 93–217 
 Cernohorsky, W.O. 1978. Tropical Pacific Marine Shells. Sydney : Pacific Publications 352 pp., 68 pls.
 Springsteen, F.J. & Leobrera, F.M. 1986. Shells of the Philippines. Manila : Carfel Seashell Museum 377 pp., 100 pls. 
 Wilson, B. 1994. Australian Marine Shells. Prosobranch Gastropods. Kallaroo, WA : Odyssey Publishing Vol. 2 370 pp.

External links
 Claremont, M.; Houart, R.; Williams, S. T.; Reid, D. G. (2012). A molecular phylogenetic framework for the Ergalataxinae (Neogastropoda: Muricidae). Journal of Molluscan Studies. 79(1): 19–29
 

Oppomorus
Gastropods described in 1829